General elections were held in Jamaica on Thursday, 3 September 2020 to elect 63 members of Parliament. As the constitution stipulates a five-year parliamentary term, the next elections were not expected until between 25 February and 10 June 2021. However, Prime Minister Andrew Holness called early elections to ensure a united response to the ongoing COVID-19 pandemic. On the advice of Holness, Governor General Patrick Allen dissolved Parliament on 13 August 2020.

The result was a landslide victory for the ruling Jamaica Labour Party, which received 57% of the vote and won 49 seats; the People's National Party remained the opposition party, losing 16 seats. Amid the COVID-19 pandemic and the 2019–2020 dengue fever epidemic, voter turnout was only 37%, the lowest in an election since 1983.

Background
Prior to the election, the Jamaica Labour Party, led by Prime Minister Andrew Holness, formed a majority government. The largest opposition party was the People's National Party, led by Peter Phillips. Either the Jamaica Labour Party or the People's National Party have been in power since universal suffrage was introduced in 1944.

Electoral system
The 63 members of the House of Representatives are elected in single-member constituencies by first-past-the-post voting. Voters must be 18 years and over and be a citizen of Jamaica or a Commonwealth citizen.

The leader of the party commanding a majority of support in the House of Representatives is called on by the Governor General to form a government as Prime Minister, while the leader of the largest group or coalition not in government becomes the Leader of the Opposition.

Campaign
Only two parties registered to contest the election, the Jamaica Labour Party and the People's National Party, and each nominated candidates in all 63 constituencies. The two parties agreed to participate in three televised debates hosted by the Jamaica Debates Commission.

The People's National Party campaigned for a referendum on removing Queen Elizabeth II as head of state.

On 15 August 2020, the pastors of the Christian right Jamaica Progressive Party announced that the party would not contest the elections due to lack of time to prepare.

Contesting parties

Slogans and songs

Incumbent MPs not seeking re-election
Seven members of parliament did not stand for re-election:

Candidates
Candidate nominations were finalised on nomination day, 18 August 2020.  The full candidate list is presented below, along with the incumbent candidates before the election. MPs who are not standing for re-election are marked (†). Government ministers are in bold, and party leaders are in italics.

Clarendon Parish

Hanover Parish

Kingston Parish

Manchester Parish

Portland Parish

Saint Andrew Parish

Saint Ann Parish

Saint Catherine Parish

Saint Elizabeth Parish

Saint James Parish

Saint Mary Parish

Saint Thomas Parish

Trelawny Parish

Westmoreland Parish

Marginal seats
The following lists identify and rank seats using the vote margin by which the party's candidate finished behind the winning candidate in the 2015 election. This vote margin is given as a percentage of all eligible voters in the district.

For information purposes only, seats that have changed hands through subsequent by elections have been noted. Seats whose members have changed party allegiance are ignored.

Opinion polls
Don Anderson, CEO of Market Research Services Limited, Larren Peart,  founder and CEO of Bluedot Data Intelligence Limited and Bill Johnson of Johnson's Survey Research Limited Inc have commissioned opinion polling for the general election regularly sampling the electorates' opinions.

CEAC Solutions polling 
These polls are used internally by the PNP.

Results
The ECJ reported that 97% of the polling stations had opened by 7:00 AM, and the remaining stations were open by 8:00 AM.  The polls closed at 5:00 PM.  Election observers included the EU delegation to Jamaica  and a domestic NGO, Citizens Action for Free and Fair Elections (CAFFE).

Before 10:00 PM, preliminary results indicated that the JLP had won 44 seats; for the first time since 1967, the JLP was re-elected while contesting all seats.  PNP leader Phillips did not give a concession speech, but called Holness privately to offer congratulations. Phillips resigned as PNP leader on 4 September 2020. The full preliminary count indicated a total of 49 seats for the JLP. A tie in Westmoreland Eastern was declared to be won by the JLP after a recount.

PM Holness was sworn in for a new term by Governor-General Sir Patrick Allen on 7 September 2020. The ceremony, which was held at King's House, was restricted to 32 people to comply with public health measures.

References 

Jamaica
General election
Elections in Jamaica
September 2020 events in North America